The Nine Bridges Bridge near Doniphan, Nebraska was built in 1913.  It was built by the Standard Bridge Co. using Jones & Laughlin Steel Co.-rolled components.  It brought Nine Bridges Road across the Middle Channel of the Platte River and now carries a private road.

It was listed on the U.S. National Register of Historic Places in 1992.

References

Road bridges on the National Register of Historic Places in Nebraska
Bridges completed in 1913
Buildings and structures in Hall County, Nebraska
1913 establishments in Nebraska
National Register of Historic Places in Hall County, Nebraska
Steel bridges in the United States